D-glycerate dehydrogenase deficiency (or 3-phosphoglycerate dehydrogenase deficiency, PHGDH deficiency, PHGDHD) is a rare autosomal metabolic disease where the young patient is unable to produce an enzyme necessary to convert 3-phosphoglycerate into 3-phosphohydroxypyruvate, which is the only way for humans to synthesize serine.This disorder is called Neu–Laxova syndrome in neonates.

Symptoms and signs

In addition significantly shortening lifespan, PHGDH deficiencies are known to cause congenital microcephaly, psychomotor retardation, and seizures in both humans and rats, presumably due to the essential signaling within the nervous system that serine, glycine, and other downstream molecules are intimately involved with.

Cause

Homozygous or compound heterozygous mutations in 3-phosphoglycerate dehydrogenase (PHGDH) cause Neu-Laxova syndrome and phosphoglycerate dehydrogenase deficiency.

Mechanism

3-Phosphoglycerate dehydrogenase catalyzes the transition of 3-phosphoglycerate into 3-phosphohydroxypyruvate, which is the committed step in the phosphorylated pathway of L-serine biosynthesis. It is also essential in cysteine and glycine synthesis, which lie further downstream. This pathway represents the only way to synthesize serine in most organisms except plants, which uniquely possess multiple synthetic pathways. Nonetheless, the phosphorylated pathway that PHGDH participates in is still suspected to have an essential role in serine synthesis used in the developmental signaling of plants.

Diagnosis

Treatment

Treatment typically involves oral supplementation of serine and glycine.

References

External links 

Autosomal recessive disorders
Congenital disorders
Syndromes with cleft lip and/or palate
Syndromes with craniofacial abnormalities
Syndromes affecting the nervous system
Syndromes with dysmelia
Rare syndromes